The Jianghuai people (Chinese: 江淮人; pinyin: Jiānghuái rén) are people from Jianghuai over the floodplains and the estuary of the Yangtze River region. The word Jianghuai is a geographical and cultural definition of the people group living in the historical Liangjiang (两江) area, southeastern Henan province, Suzhou, and the central region of Anhui province.

For a long period in Chinese history, Jianghuai connotated high cultural and economic development. After Beijing and Shanghai, Jiangsu ranks third in per capita GDP among Chinese provinces and province-level entities. The use of the word Jianghuai (江淮) is occasionally interchangeable with that of Jiangnan (江南).

Discounting overseas Chinese, approximately 77 million Jianghuai people reside in China. The region is unique as it was a linguistic bypass connecting north China to the south, a remnant of the evolution of the Standard Chinese. Due to its rich commercial history and prestigious artisans, the people of Jianghuai emanated a character of gentleness and subtlety in traditional Chinese literature. Although the validity of Marco Polo's description of his interactions with the locals in southern China for example his description of white skinned Chinese people.

Terminology 

The geographical abbreviation of the word Jianghuai refers to the people who originate from the region in between the Yangtze River and the Huai River. In the present day, this region is administered by both the Jiangsu and Anhui provincial authorities of the People's Republic of China. In general, within the Jiangsu province (Jiang) they are three regional dialectic and cultural groups: Subei (苏北), Suzhong (苏中), and Sunan (苏南). Within the Anhui province (Huai), there has been the cultural divide between the east and the west, Huaidong (淮东) and Huaixi (淮西). Historically speaking, the region of Sunan is also referred to as part of Jiangnan or Wu, a linguistically and ethnically diverse region linguistic marker for the region encompassing today's Shanghai municipality.

History

Pre-Song period  
Large-scale agricultural activity was significant from about 7000 to 5000 years ago during the Neolithic Age in the Jianghuai area extended south of the yangtze river. According to several unearthed archaeological artifacts among the various prehistoric people groups, these matriarchal societies such as Huaiyi people. The kingdom of ancient Wu (吴国) conquered the Huaiyi people, later conquered by the kingdom of ancient Yue (越国) and Chu (楚国), emerged as warring factions vied for dominance in the lower Yangtze River region during the Spring and Autumn period. Due to a lack of textual and archaeological evidence, the Jianghuai people inherited the names of these kingdoms as they were often called the Wu, Yue, and Chu people in ancient Han literature. The enduring conflict fought between these two kingdoms was popularized by the tale of Sleeping on Brushwood and Tasting Gall (卧薪尝胆) of which depicted the Yue’s king, Goujian (勾践), as an unwavering figure who had suffered intolerable humiliation under the imprisonment of his adversary. Eventually, he was able to taste his revenge as his kingdom subjugated the state of Wu, the rivalry kingdom. For the Chinese who associate the capacity to swallow hardship with the people from the south, the king’s legend became a widespread idiom, a catchphrase, in the Chinese language. The ethnic Han Chinese residing in the central plains of China had begun migrating towards the Yangtze River to escape war and famine since early times. As a result, the indigenous population began to Sinicize through adopting Han rituals and technologies. During the Jin dynasty, massive migration of Han people triggered ethnic fusion and “regional dialects to ‘cross’ the Qin-Huai Line and penetrate to the South.” The region that accepted the most refugees was the modern-day Jiangsu province, primarily the population centers such as Nanjing, Zhenjiang, Changzhou, Yangzhou, Huaiyin. Cultural assimilation was not achieved without resistance, as indicated by the Records of the Three Kingdoms (三国志), the Jianghuai region was prone to non-Han ethnic revolts. It was evident that these rebellions crippled several ancient Chinese kingdoms that tried to suppress them. According to Sui Geographical Chronicles (隋书), the result of Sinicization was apparent for which by the Sui dynasty the Yue people were “people of virtue and courtesy … due to their harmonious and noble customs and teachings, likewise their ethos are revered” (人君子尚礼 … 故风俗澄清而道教隆洽亦其风气所尚也). Amid the An Lushan Rebellion, a period of rapid social unrest following massive depopulation throughout the Yellow River region, the Jianghuai area once again became the sanctuary for the ethnic Han people, who flocked from the north. The Tang dynasty was particularly memorable for its achievement as an enduring multi-ethnic empire, albeit such nature also contributed to its eventual downfall.

Song to Early Qing period 
The region Jianghuai, commonly known as Jiangnan or Huainan during the Song dynasty, undergone a significant economic transformation as the Chinese central authority begin to shift its administrative oversight to the south due to the invasions of the nomads. After the Northern Song dynasty was shattered and was forced to relocate its capital to the Lin An (临安). The scale of southern mass migration of both ethnic Han people and other ethnicities and foreigners exceeded those of the previous Chinese dynasties as approximately five million people fled their hometowns. The patriotic poet, Lu You (陆游), reflected that “families across the streets came from the four corners of the country, and the locals comprise a minority” (沿路居民大抵多四方人土著财十一也). From the Dabie mountain range to the lower Yangtze River's southern bank, the Han migrants gradually absorbed the indigenous population as they became the ruling entity propelling political, economic, and social development in southern China, albeit in further south, the Sinicization process was more prolonged. The Southern Song dynasty epitomized the height of mercantile, urban, science, and cultural development in China. All the way to the Cantonese south, the middle-class Han population was beginning to indulge in economic prosperity induced by the consumer culture. Establishing their small urban workshops and producing luxury goods such as porcelain and silk fabrics for the wealthy bureaucrats, the Jianghuai people were not just merchants but also early entrepreneurs in Chinese history. Private businesses were booming, and the Jianghuai merchants became so powerful that Wu argued in his article, “some people were rethinking the rationality of the policy government-controlled commerce.” Considering the magnetic compass invention by the notable polymathic scientist, Shen Kuo (沈括) and his discovery of the concept of due north, the Jianghuai people were also historically speaking seafaring travelers. During the Ming dynasty, the famous admiral, Zheng He (郑和), embarked on his seven Indian Ocean voyages from the ports of Nanjing. Most of the shipbuilders and the sailors who displayed distinguished maritime knowledge came from the Jianghuai region. Until the eighteenth century, Jianghuai still functioned as China's commercial and cultural hub where merchants exchanged grains and raw materials along the tributaries of the famous Grand Canal (京杭大运河). Yangzhou was a transshipment hub where the Grand Cannel and the Yangtze River converge. According to E. H. Schafer, an American historian and sinologist, the city of Yangzhou was 
Constructed under the edict of Emperor Yang of Sui, the Grand Canal enriched the Jianghuai people for over a thousand years during his reign under the occasion of inspecting the economic development in southern China. Since the Ming dynasty, the migration trend in this region experienced a seismic change: people from the south, Hakka and Jiangxi Gan immgirants, began migrating north and settling in the Jianghuai region. Nevertheless, Jianghuai were still the hodgepodge of migrants, as in late Ming, “emigrants and their descendants in Yangzhou outnumbered Yangzhou natives twenty to one.”

Mid-Qing period to the present 
Following years of flooding neglected by the Qing government and the replacement of the Grand Canal by sea transport, in the mid-eighteenth century Jianghuai region began to decline as it began to lose its economic significance. In particular, the city of “Yangzhou, for example, was described as a ‘skeleton’ of its former self,” and the arrival of the Europeans exacerbated the wealth disparity between Subei and Sunan.

Demographics 
Most of those who speak one of the dialects from the Jianghuai region are nowadays mostly the residence of Jiangsu and Anhui province, along with a minority of expatriate part of the overseas Chinese community. According to Chinese statistical bureau, approximately 150 million people reside in the provinces of Jiangsu and Anhui. Out of those 150 million, approximately 70 million people retained their ancestorial linguistic lineage and practiced speaking Jianghuai Mandarin at home.

Cultural Identity

Language 
Jianghuai Mandarin, as known as Lower Yangtze Mandarin, is a language group that is spoken to the north of Wu and Gan. Jianghuai can also be further subdivided into Hongchao, which contains the Nanjing variety, Tairu, and Huangxiao. Nanjing Mandarin became the standard pronunciation of Chinese during the Ming dynasty, and it was only until the mid-nineteen century that the administrational lingua franca began shifting to the Beijing dialect.

Given that ethnic fusion occurred more frequently and vigorously in northern China than it did in the south, southern Mandarin progressed less rapidly than in the north through the preservation of the Middle Chinese tonal articulations. In particular, Jianghuai Mandarin distinguishes itself by stop consonant pronunciations and tonal articulations.

Literature 
The dominance of Jianghuai cultural identity, specifically its literature, did not rise to prominence until the Tang dynasty as the “area of Suzhou and Yangzhou had shifted from an exotic and remote place … to the enchanting site of pleasure quarters and comforting vistas.” Jianghuai cultural identity was represented by the urban elite writers, and "when speaking of Jiangnan most Chinese people always associate the term with the Four Scholars of Jiangnan (江南四大才子). These four famous scholars were: Tang Yin 唐伯虎, Zhu Yun Ming 祝允明, Wen Zheng Ming 文征明, Xu Zhen Qing 徐祯卿.”

Cuisine 

Jianghuai cuisine, more commonly known as Huaiyang cuisine (淮扬菜), is one of The Eight Great Cuisines in China. Huaiyang cuisine is known for its unique freshness of its ingredients, the light and pureness of its taste, and the chef's meticulous cutting technique. Some of the delicacies of Huaiyang cuisine include: “delicious braised pork, which is served with small quail eggs; sweet and sour spare ribs; and the huge lion’s head meatball which comes with a light savory sauce and can be served a la carte or over rice.”

Architecture 
Jianghuai architecture is renowned internationally by its charm and quirkiness. Although built on cannels and rivers and similarly resembling the architectures in Venice, Italy, these Jiangnan houses represent the human ingenuity of the locals to combat climate while paying homage to traditional architectural style. Usually decorated with white walls and black roofs these settlements are unique in its features from the rest of the Chinese architectures and are capable for housing big families.

See also
Subei people

References

Ethnic groups in China
Han Chinese people